The Westfield Freezing Works was a large meat processing facility in the Auckland suburb of Westfield, New Zealand. The site was established by Auckland's Hellaby family in 1908. Generations of families worked at Westfield, but economic reforms in the mid-1980s made the works uncompetitive and the site finally closed in 1989.

History
During World War I a number of freezing works opened across the country to meet the demand for New Zealand produce. Prime Minister William Massey opened Westfield Freezing Works on 29 May 1916 with 2,000 people attending the opening.

Shunting Locomotives
For years, a Hudswell Clarke locomotive worked the many sidings. This was joined, in 1970, by a dieselised steam loco, rebuilt by A & G Price. Both locomotives are now preserved in Ngongotaha.

Notable former employees of the freezing works include
 Anand Satyanand
 David Lange
 Phil Goff

Gallery

References

Buildings and structures in Auckland
Commercial buildings completed in 1916
Meat processing in New Zealand
Buildings and structures demolished in 1989
1989 disestablishments in New Zealand
1916 establishments in New Zealand
Demolished buildings and structures in New Zealand